Midnight sun is a natural phenomenon that occurs when the Sun remains visible at the local midnight.

Midnight Sun may also refer to:

Theater, film and television
Midnight Sun (ballet), a 1915 ballet by Léonide Massine
The Midnight Sun (1926 film), an American silent drama film
The Midnight Sun (1943 film), a French adventure film
Midnight Sun (2006 film), a Japanese film
Midnight Sun (2014 film), a Canadian/Italian film
Midnight Sun (2018 film), an American romance film
"The Midnight Sun" (The Twilight Zone), a 1961 episode of Twilight Zone
Midnattssol or Midnight Sun, a French/Swedish 2016 TV series
Midnight Sun, a Cirque du Soleil performance held in Montreal in 2004
Midnight Sun Broadcasting Company, founded by Austin E. Lathrop
Midnight Sun (musical), a 2021 South Korean musical

Literature
Midnight Sun (Meyer novel), a book by Stephenie Meyer
Midnight Sun (graphic novel), a graphic novel by Ben Towle
Midnight Sun (character), a supervillain in the Marvel Comics universe
Midnight Sun, a novel by Ramsey Campbell
Midnight's Sun - A Story of Wolves, a Garry Kilworth novel
Midnight Sun, a novel by Jo Nesbø

Music
Midnight Sun (band), a Swedish heavy metal band

Albums
Midnight Sun (Redgum album), 1986, and the title track
Midnight Sun, a 1993 album by Maggie Reilly
Midnight Sun (Lou Donaldson album), recorded in 1960, released in 1980
Midnight Sun (Herb Alpert album), 1992
Midnight Sun (The Choirboys album), and the title track
Midnight Sun, a 1983 album by Sir Douglas Quintet
The Midnight Sun (Jack McDuff album), 1968
The Midnight Sun (C Duncan album), 2016
Midnight Sun (Beast EP), 2012
Midnight Sun (GOASTT album), a 2014 album by The Ghost of a Saber Tooth Tiger
Midnight Sun, album by William Galison
Midnight Sun (Aimer album), 2014
Midnight Sun (Dee Dee Bridgewater album), 2011
Midnight Sun (JO1 EP), 2022

Songs
"Midnight Sun" (Elena song), 2010
"Midnight Sun" (Lionel Hampton and Sonny Burke song), 1947
"Midnight Sun", a song by AFI from Black Sails in the Sunset
"Midnight Sun", a song by Asia from Alpha
"Midnight Sun", a song by Badfinger from Magic Christian Music
"Midnight Sun", a song by Calexico and Iron & Wine from Years to Burn
"Midnight Sun", a song by Deine Lakaien from April Skies
"Midnight Sun", a song by Duran Duran from Medazzaland
"Midnight Sun", a song by F.Cuz from Gorgeous
"Midnight Sun", a song by Helloween from Better Than Raw
"Midnight Sun", a song by The Sounds from Crossing the Rubicon
"Midnight Sun", a song by Ivy from Long Distance

Sports
Midnight Sun Game, a baseball game played annually on the night of the summer solstice in Fairbanks, Alaska
Midnight Sun Marathon (disambiguation)
Midnight Sun Solar Race Team, a Canadian solar car race team

Other uses
Midnight Sun (horse), an influential Tennessee Walking Horse sire
Marvel's Midnight Suns, a tactical role-playing game

See also

The Midnight Sons, a fictional team of supernatural superheroes appearing in Marvel Comics
Land of the Midnight Sun (disambiguation)
Midnattsol (modified spelling of the Norwegian word for 'midnight sun'), a German/Norwegian heavy metal band
Midnight Sunshine, a 1984 studio album (featuring a song of the same name) from Kikki Danielsson
"Midnight Sunrise", a song by Turisas
Jewish law in the polar regions

Midnight star (disambiguation)
Midnight (disambiguation)
Sun (disambiguation)